The Coventry Canal is a navigable narrow canal in the Midlands of England.

It starts in Coventry and ends  to the north at Fradley Junction, just north of Lichfield, where it joins the Trent and Mersey Canal. It also has connections with the Ashby Canal, the Birmingham and Fazeley Canal and the Oxford Canal.

Some maps show the canal as a northern and a southern section, connected by a stretch of the Birmingham and Fazeley Canal, but others, including the Canal and River Trust show the through route as the Coventry Canal. This reflects a complicated period of ownership and re-leasing when the Coventry Canal company was in financial difficulties during construction.

It runs through or past the towns of Bedworth, Nuneaton, Atherstone, Polesworth and Tamworth.  It is navigable for boats up to  length,  beam and  headroom.  It forms part of the Warwickshire ring.

Route in detail

The canal starts at Coventry Canal Basin. The basin was opened in 1769 and expanded in 1788.  It is situated just north of Coventry City Centre and just outside the city's inner ring road.  Many of the buildings and the site were restored between 1993 and 1995.  The Canal Bridge, Canal House and the warehouses are grade II listed buildings.  All boats going in and out of Coventry Canal Basin have to pass through the Canal Bridge.

From the canal basin, the canal meanders north through Coventry passing under many road bridges including prominent hump-back bridges under the Foleshill Road, Foleshill through Little Heath and the Longford Road, Longford.

Five miles north of Coventry, at Hawkesbury Junction, a superbly preserved iron bridge crosses the start of the Oxford Canal, which journeys southwards to join the River Thames at Oxford.  At Hawkesbury Junction there are buildings from the working days of the canal, and the Greyhound pub is a traditional stop for boaters.  Hawkesbury Junction is also known to regular boaters as Sutton Stop, though strictly this refers to the stop lock, a short distance along the Oxford Canal.

From Marston Junction, the Coventry canal runs north-west through Nuneaton, Atherstone and Polesworth, to Tamworth. At Atherstone a set of 11 locks (Top Lock No. 1 to Atherstone Bottom Lock No. 11) lower the level of the canal  towards Polesworth. The only other locks on the Coventry canal are the two Glascote locks which lower the level of the canal a further  about  before Fazeley Junction.

In a suburb of Tamworth, at Fazeley Junction, boaters can turn south towards Birmingham along the Birmingham & Fazeley Canal.

The Coventry Canal continues northwards to end at Fradley Junction where it joins the Trent and Mersey Canal.  From Fazeley to a point halfway to Fradley, some maps show the canal as the "Birmingham and Fazeley Canal" (see History).

History
The Coventry Canal Company was formed in 1768.  James Brindley was commissioned to build the canal, and work started on it in December that year.  Due to the high standards of construction demanded by Brindley, the canal company ran out of money by the time the canal had reached Atherstone in 1769, and Brindley was replaced by Thomas Yeoman.

Thomas Dadford advised on the Canal's aqueduct over the River Tame (now known as Tame Aqueduct) in 1784, and in June 1785 Thomas Sheasby was awarded the contract to connect the Coventry Canal to the Trent and Mersey Canal.

Although the canal reached the Birmingham and Fazeley Canal at Fazeley, the final Parliament-approved stretch to the Trent and Mersey at Fradley was not finished until 1789.

The Trent and Mersey company, and the Birmingham and Fazeley company, anxious to allow through traffic between Birmingham and the Trent and Mersey Canal, gained permission to complete and operate the approved but unbuilt section from Fazeley to Fradley.  The B&F worked north from Fazeley, and the T&M worked south from Fradley.  The full length from Coventry to Fradley was opened in 1789.

The Coventry Canal company later bought the northern section, nowadays sometimes referred to as Coventry Canal (detached portion), while the middle section remained under the ownership of the Birmingham and Fazeley Canal, and thus some maps show this middle section as the Birmingham and Fazeley Canal, but others describe the complete route as the Coventry Canal. The Canal and River Trust who manage the canal describe the whole route from Coventry to the Trent and Mersey Canal as the Coventry Canal.

Operation
The Coventry canal was a vital trade artery for many years.  In particular, it was part of a Birmingham–London route via the B&F Canal, Coventry Canal, Oxford Canal, and the Thames.

When the Grand Junction Canal and some smaller companies (which much later merged to form the Grand Union Canal company) opened a direct rival route from Birmingham to London, via Warwick, Napton, Braunston, and Bletchley, trade still remained high on the Coventry.  This was partly because of the work done by the Oxford company to shorten its route north of Braunston, and because Grand Junction traffic using the Braunston–Fazeley route avoided the high tolls charged by the Oxford Canal company on its  Braunston–Napton section (which was also part of the new route).

The Coventry paid a dividend right up to 1947 and remained navigable to the present day. Today, the canal is also a popular route for narrowboat trips. Many tourists hire narrowboats to explore Coventry's industrial heritage.

It was nationalised in 1948 being operated first by the British Transport Board and then by the British Waterways Board, the forerunners of British Waterways.

In 1957, Coventry Canal Society was established to promote the proper use and maintenance of the canal, and to protect its interests. The canal acts as a base to Mercia Canoe Club, which is part of Coventry Canal Society.

Features

See also

Arbury Canals

Gallery

References

External links

Coventry Canal Society
Coventry Canal map on canalmap.net, using OpenStreetMap data
Mercia Canoe Club
 Guide to Coventry Canal from waterscape.com
images & map of mile markers seen along the Coventry canal

Canals in England
Transport in Staffordshire
Tourist attractions in Staffordshire
Canals in Warwickshire
Coventry
Buildings and structures in Coventry
Canals opened in 1789
1789 establishments in England